The 1926–27 Marquette Blue and Gold men's ice hockey season was the 5th season of play for the program.

Season
For the fifth consecutive season, Marquette brought in a new head coach. This time the Hilltoppers were led by Kay Iverson, who had helmed the program at Wisconsin the previous two seasons. The team returned just two players from the previous year's squad and Iverson brought in a large number of new players, many of whom were freshman. While even the varsity team had a number of first-year players, three standouts were not included in this group. George McTeer, Don McFadyen and Pudge MacKenzie all grew up in the Calgary-area with the first two having won the 1926 Memorial Cup and MacKenzie on the provincial runner-up team. The "Three Macs" turned in tremendous performances early in the season, helping Marquette to a 14–0 win and then a sweep of Chicago A.C., a strong amateur club.

Marquette finished as the runner up for the Winter Frolic tournament and used an lineup made entirely of freshman in their only intercollegiate game of the season. While several of the players on the freshman team also played on varsity squad, not all were included in the varsity lineup. 

Dean Van Patter served as team manager.

Roster

Standings

Schedule and results

|-
!colspan=12 style=";" | Regular Season

† Michigan Tech records list the game's score as 7–4, however, contemporary reports have it 5–3 in their favor.

References

Marquette Golden Eagles men's ice hockey seasons
Marquette
Marquette
Marquette
Marquette